Song of Times is the fifth and, as of this writing, final studio album by American progressive rock band Starcastle.

Release
Song of Times was released in 2007, three years after the death of bassist and founding member Gary Strater. It featured members from all eras of the group, as well as artwork by Annie Haslam and Ed Unitsky. It was very well received by fans and critics alike.

Track listing
All songs written by Gary Strater, Bruce Botts and George Harp, except where noted.
 "Red Season" – 5:28
 "Babylon" – 9:24
 "Song of Times" – 6:04 (Gary Strater)
 "Islands" – 4:59
 "Faces of Change" – 4:56
 "Love Is The Only Place" – 4:27 (Steve Hagler/Matt Stewart/Al Lewis)
 "Master Machine" – 4:24
 "All For The Thunder" – 6:06 (Steve Hagler/Matt Stewart/Gary Strater)
 "Children Believe" – 6:26 (Gary Strater/Bruce Botts/George Harp/Scott McKenzie)
 "Babylon (edited)" – 4:37

Personnel

 Gary Strater – Bass guitar, Taurus pedals (all except 3), background vocals (1,2,5,6,7,8), keyboards (3)
 Matt Stewart – Electric sitar, acoustic and electric guitars (all songs), background vocals (1,6,7,8)
 Bruce Botts – Guitar (1,2,4,5,7,9), background vocals (5)
 Steve Tassler – Drums (6,8), percussion (1,4,5), synthesizers (4), background vocals (1,2,6,8)
 Al Lewis – Lead vocals (all except 8), background vocals (all except 8), drums (9) and percussion (8)
 Herb Schildt – Keyboards (1,2,6,7,8)
 John O'Hara – Keyboards (3.4.9)
 Neal Robinson – Keyboards (5,6,8)
 Steve Hagler – Guitar (6), background vocals (1,4,7)
 Terry Luttrell – Lead vocals (8), background vocals (7)
 Mark McGee – Guitar (1,4,7)
 Jeff Koehnke – Drums (2,5)
 Scott McKenzie – Drums (1,4,7)

References

Starcastle albums
2007 albums